"To Protect and Serve Man" is the 11th episode of the supernatural drama television series Grimm of season 2 and the 33rd overall, which premiered on November 9, 2012, on the cable network NBC. The episode was written by Dan E. Fesman, and was directed by Omar Madha.

Plot
Opening quote: "The beast was simply the Call of the Wild personified... which some natures hear to their own destruction."

In a flashback 7 years earlier, Hank (Russell Hornsby) and his partner are called to a fight in a house. Upon getting there, they find a man dead and another wounded. A man, Craig Ferren (Jason Gedrick) escapes from the scene but Hank catches him and arrests him while he yells seeing "monsters".

In the present, a day before Ferren's execution, now knowing about the Wesen, Hank tells Nick (David Giuntoli) that Ferren may be right about the Wesen and asks for help in proving his innocence. When they find a drawing of what Ferren saw, Nick discovers it's a Wendigo. These Wesen are cannibals that kill humans and put their bodies on their houses. They go to the house's location to find the bodies but discover that a grocery store was built on the house.

They decide to find the wounded man's, John Kreski's (Jamie McShane) address. They find the bodies under the house, but are attacked by Kreski. Nick is thrown into the pit of bodies and Kreski escapes. Nick manages to call DA Lauren Castro (Lisa Vidal) to postpone the execution to find the bodies. Hank kills Kreski when he attacks Nick and the authorities inspect the grocery store and find the bodies and with this evidence, Ferren is pronounced innocent and expected to be released.

Renard (Sasha Roiz) arrives to the spice shop in an attempt to find a cure to reverse potion, bringing Juliette (Bitsie Tulloch) with him. They kiss as they are waiting when Monroe (Silas Weir Mitchell) walks in on them and is shocked to discover who the obsession is with.

Reception

Viewers
The episode was viewed by 5.21 million people, earning a 1.7/5 in the 18-49 rating demographics on the Nielson ratings scale, ranking second on its timeslot and fourth for the night in the 18-49 demographics, behind Malibu Country, Undercover Boss, and Shark Tank. This was an 8% decrease in viewership from the previous episode, which was watched by 5.64 million viewers with a 1.8/5. This means that 1.7 percent of all households with televisions watched the episode, while 5 percent of all households watching television at that time watched it. With DVR factoring in, the episode was watched by 8.08 million viewers with a 2.9 ratings share in the 18-49 demographics.

Critical reviews
"To Protect and Serve Man" received positive reviews. The A.V. Club's Les Chappell gave the episode a "B+" grade and wrote, "'To Protect And Serve Man' doesn't do much to break this trend  — with the exception of one promising development I'll get to later — but as a case of the week it's above duller installments like 'The Bottle Imp' and 'The Other Side.' This is largely because it's tied so closely to the smartest move Grimm made all season, the decision to bring Hank into the fold and let him in on Nick's secret life. Hank's new perspective leads him to reconsider a case from seven years earlier, where an Army veteran named Craig Ferrin shot two brothers and claimed they were 'monsters' who wanted to eat him."

Nick McHatton from TV Fanatic, gave a 4.2 star rating out of 5, stating: "As much as I tend to complain when Grimm decides to veer back to its procedural roots, tonight's episode didn't bother me in the slightest. It could be due to some of the serial arcs this season because they are slow burning, but then that would take away from the genuinely compelling case."

Josie Campbell from TV.com wrote, "'To Protect and Serve Man,' the last episode of Grimm before the show's fall finale, continued to lean on the series' cop drama side rather than mythology to deliver a solidly entertaining story about saving an innocent man's life, and a solidly obsession-based story of Renard/Juliette smoochies."

References

External links
 

Grimm (season 2) episodes
2012 American television episodes